This is a list of VTV dramas released in 2005.

←2004 - 2005 - 2006→

VTV Tet dramas
These films air on VTV channels during Tet holiday.

VTV1

VTV3

Vietnamese dramas in VTV1 Monday to Saturday night time slot
Starting in 2005, the VTV1 night drama time slot was reduced back to one line-up (with the addition of Saturday night since March) for both Vietnamese and foreign dramas after a year and three months split in two lines (21:00-22:00 for Vietnamese dramas and 22:00-23:00 for foreign dramas).

These dramas air from 21:00 to 22:00 on Monday to Friday and 22:00 to 23:00 on Saturday, on VTV1

VTV3 Cinema For Saturday Afternoon dramas
These dramas air in early Saturday afternoon on VTV3 with the duration approximately 70 minutes as a part of the program Cinema for Saturday afternoon (Vietnamese: Điện ảnh chiều thứ Bảy).

VTV3 Sunday Literature & Art dramas
These dramas air in early Sunday afternoon on VTV3 as a part of the program Sunday Literature & Art (Vietnamese: Văn nghệ Chủ Nhật).

See also
 List of dramas broadcast by Vietnam Television (VTV)
 List of dramas broadcast by Hanoi Radio Television (HanoiTV)
 List of dramas broadcast by Vietnam Digital Television (VTC)
List of television programmes broadcast by Vietnam Television (VTV)

References

External links
VTV.gov.vn – Official VTV Website 
VTV.vn – Official VTV Online Newspaper 

Vietnam Television original programming
2005 in Vietnamese television